John Espie (1868–1911) was a Scottish professional association footballer who played as a centre half. His sole appearance for Manchester City came in March 1896, in a draw with Burton Swifts.

References

1868 births
1911 deaths
Scottish footballers
Association football central defenders
Burnley F.C. players
Manchester City F.C. players
English Football League players
Footballers from Hamilton, South Lanarkshire
Scotland junior international footballers
Burnbank Athletic F.C. players
Scottish Junior Football Association players